Novak Djokovic defeated Casper Ruud in the final, 7–5, 6–3 to win the singles tennis title at the 2022 ATP Finals. It was his sixth Tour Finals title, equaling Roger Federer's record. He became the oldest singles champion in tournament history at 35 years old and also claimed the biggest prize check in tennis history at $4,740,300. Djokovic also set the longest time gap between a player's first to most recent Tour Finals titles, at 14 years (the first being in 2008), and became the first player to win Tour Finals titles in three different decades.

Alexander Zverev was the reigning champion, but did not qualify this year following a long-term injury sustained at the French Open.

Carlos Alcaraz became the youngest-ever ATP year-end No. 1, despite withdrawing from the tournament. Rafael Nadal and Stefanos Tsitsipas were also in contention for the year-end No. 1 ranking at the beginning of the tournament.

Félix Auger-Aliassime and Taylor Fritz made their debuts at the event. Alcaraz would have also made his debut, but withdrew due to an injury sustained during the Paris Masters two weeks prior.

Nadal was attempting to complete the career Super Slam.

Seeds

Alternates

Draw

Finals

Green group

Red group 

Standings are determined by: 1. number of wins; 2. number of matches played; 3. in two-players-ties, head-to-head records; 4. in three-players-ties, percentage of sets won, then percentage of games won; 5. ATP rankings.

References

External links 
 Official website
 Group standings
 Singles draw

Singles